Dead Babies or dead baby may refer to:

Literature, film, and music
 Dead Babies (novel), a 1975 novel by Martin Amis
 Dead Babies (film), a 2000 film based on the novel
 "Dead Babies", a song by Alice Cooper from the 1971 album Killer

Other
 Infant mortality
 Dead baby jokes